Sweetie is a term of endearment.
Sweetie or Sweety may refer to:

Fictional characters 
 Sweetie (internet avatar), a CGI child used by children's rights organization Terre des Hommes 
 Sweetie, a character from Tiny Toon Adventures
 Sweetie, a character from the Diary of a Wimpy Kid series

Films 
 Sweetie (1929 film), a college musical starring Helen Kane, Jack Oakie and Nancy Carroll
 Sweetie (1989 film), an Australian film

Food
 Sweetie (apple), a trademarked New Zealand apple cultivar
 Oroblanco or sweetie, a fruit that is a cross between an acidless pummelo and a white grapefruit
 "Sweety", "sweetie" or "sweet", a slang term for confectionery

Music

Artists 
 Sweety, a Mandopop band
 Sweety (Japanese band)
 Saweetie, American rapper
 Sweetie Irie, British reggae singer and DJ born Dean Bent
 The Sweeties, or The Sweethearts of Sigma, an American trio of backing singers

Songs 
 "Sweetie", by Fumiko Orikasa
 "Sweetie", by Le Tigre
 "Sweety Sweety",  by And One